Kolbjørn Hauge (2 April 1926 – 15 August 2007)  was a Norwegian schoolteacher and non-fiction writer.

Biography
Hauge was born at Kyrkjøy  on Finnøy in Ryfylke. He was the son of Kolbein Andersson Hauge (1889–1972) and Marianne Rasmusdotter Auglænd (1893–1967). His brother was journalist, novelist, poet and historian Alfred Hauge (1915–1986).
Hauge grow up in a pietistic rural environment. He had a versatile career including gardener,  fisherman, roadworker, clerk and sailor before embarking in a career in education. He obtained a teacher degree at Stord/Haugesund University College which he attended from 1947-51.

His non-fiction books include Stor norsk rimordbok from 1990. He made his literary debut in 1991 with the novel Kofferten, and his literary breakthrough was Heit juice from 1993 for which he  was awarded the Sunnmørsprisen. 
He won the Riverton Prize for Død mann i boks in 1995. Later books are the crime novels Til jord skal du bli from 1997, Over mitt lik from 1999, and Nord og ned from 2003. His children's book Hitlers labyrint was published in 1998.

References

1926 births
2007 deaths
People from Finnøy
Norwegian male novelists
Norwegian crime fiction writers
Norwegian non-fiction writers
Norwegian children's writers
Norwegian schoolteachers
20th-century Norwegian novelists
21st-century Norwegian novelists
20th-century Norwegian male writers
21st-century Norwegian male writers
20th-century non-fiction writers
Male non-fiction writers